Bridgeboro is an unincorporated community in Worth County, in the U.S. state of Georgia.

History
A post office called Bridgeboro was established in 1905, and remained in operation until 1957. It is unknown why the name "Bridgeboro" was applied to this community. The Georgia General Assembly incorporated the "Town of Bridgeboro" in 1912. The town's charter was dissolved in 1995.

References

Former municipalities in Georgia (U.S. state)
Unincorporated communities in Worth County, Georgia
Unincorporated communities in Georgia (U.S. state)
Populated places disestablished in 1995